Frame-IT! (also known as Frame-it) was an application for developing HTML frames released in 1996 by GME Systems. It featured a user interface in which you could control frame size, the number of frames, frame location, and frame appearance without knowledge of HTML. It allowed completed frames to be copied to clipboard, to be saved, or to be previewed in a browser.

Frame-it was listed in PC/Computing magazine's list of "1,001 Top Free Internet Downloads" for 1997.

Frame-IT! is no longer available at its original website, though it can still be downloaded from mirrors.

Shareware
Although the software originally cost  and came with a 14-day evaluation, by 1999, the software had become freeware. Users were instructed to register using the following code to make full use of the software.
Name : Registered User
Code : 29700

Releases

Frame-It! had the following releases:
 1.21
 1.23

See also
 FrameGang

Annotations

References

External links
 Frame-It V 1.23 Windows 95, SfR Freeware/Shareware Archive
 Frame-It V 1.23 and 1.21

1996 software